Haluk Kurosman (born 1 March 1975, Istanbul) is a Turkish music producer and co-founder (together with Hadi Elazzi) of GRGDN, a music production – management company and record label; producing, mixing and mastering the albums of successful young Turkish artists. Kurosman started to play the guitar at the age of 15 and had his own band, where he was also the frontman. By the age of 23 he decided to move "backstage" and work as a producer. He is a graduate of Deutsche Schule Istanbul and Marmara University in business administration. Later he went to Canada, where he attended Ontario Institute of Audio Recording Technology (OIART) and graduated in 1999 as "perhaps the most brilliant student to attend OIART since its inception". Thus the institute has founded the Kurosman Award to be given to the most talented students.

Besides being a producer, Haluk Kurosman also contributed to some of the albums as a musician (guitars, keyboards) and as a co-songwriter-lyricist.

In 2011 he parted ways with GRGDN to work as a freelance producer.

Discography
Haluk Kurosman's works include the album maNga, that reached gold status in Turkey as well as Emre Aydın's Afili Yalnızlık album that is currently a smash hit in Turkey. The full list of Kurosman's works is as follows:

 2003, 6. Cadde, 6. Cadde
 2004, gripin, Hikayeler Anlatıldı
 2004, maNga, maNga
 2005, gripin, Hikayeler Anlatıldı 2
 2005, Vega, Hafif Müzik
 2006, maNga, maNga+
 2006, emreaydın, Afili Yalnızlık
 2007, gripin, gripin
 2009, maNga, Şehr-i Hüzün
 2010, maNga, We Could Be The Same
 2010, gripin, MS 05 03 2010
 2010, Aslı Gökyokuş, Büyüdük
 2011, Efsun, Sessiz Olmalıyım
 2011, Kolpa, Son Nefesim
 2011, Cartel, Bugünkü Neşen Cartel'den
 2011, Seksendört, Akıyor Zaman
 2011, gripin, Sensiz Olmaz Galatasaray
 2012, Kolpa, Yatağın Soğuk Tarafı

References

External links
 Official Website
 Haluk Kurosman Official Myspace
 GRGDN Official Site

1975 births
Living people
Deutsche Schule Istanbul alumni
Musicians from Istanbul
Turkish record producers
Turkish songwriters